Gymnopilus permollis is a species of mushroom in the family Hymenogastraceae.

See also

List of Gymnopilus species

External links
Gymnopilus permollis at Index Fungorum

permollis
Fungi of North America
Taxa named by William Alphonso Murrill